The 15007 / 15008 Krishak Express is an Indian Railways train of North Eastern Railway Zone, Varanasi railway division.

15007 - Starts  at 17:00 Hrs and reach  on 2nd day at 5:45 Hrs

15008 - Starts  at 23:10 Hrs and reach  on 2nd day at 12:35 Hrs

Important Stops

Reservation
People have to take an advanced reservation ticket to travel in the train except for the General class. Tatkal ticketing facility is also available for this train.

Coach composition
The coach composition of the 15007 train is:

 1 AC I Tier + II Tier (Hybrid) 
 1 AC II Tier
 3 AC III Tier
 8 Sleeper Coaches
 6 General
 2 Second-class Luggage/parcel van

Passenger trains originating from Varanasi
Passenger trains originating from Lucknow
Named passenger trains of India
Rail transport in Uttar Pradesh
Express trains in India